Sir Nigel John Thrift    (born 12 October 1949 in Bath) is a British academic and geographer. In 2018 he was appointed as Chair of the Committee on Radioactive Waste Management, a committee that gives independent scientific and technical advice on radioactive waste to the UK government and the devolved administrations. He is a Visiting Professor at the University of Oxford and Tsinghua University and an Emeritus Professor at the University of Bristol. In 2016 and 2017 he was the executive director of the Schwarzman Scholars, an international leadership program at Tsinghua University in Beijing. He was the Vice-Chancellor of the University of Warwick from 2006 to 2016. He is a leading academic in the fields of human geography and the social sciences.

Early life and career
Born in 1949, and educated at Nailsea School south west of Bristol, Thrift then studied geography at the University of Wales, Aberystwyth and did his PhD at the University of Bristol. Thrift has held posts at numerous universities, including the University of Cambridge, the University of Leeds, the Australian National University, the University of Wales, Lampeter, the University of Bristol, and the University of Oxford.

In 2005 he was appointed vice-chancellor of the University of Warwick, taking up the position in July 2006. He intended to retire at the end of the university’s 50th anniversary year in 2015, but extended by a month to the end of January 2016.

Thrift was knighted in the 2015 New Year Honours for services to higher education.

Contribution to geography
Thrift has been described as one of the world's leading human geographers and social scientists. He was the third most highly cited human geographer between 1996 and 2017.  In 1982 he co-founded the journal Environment and Planning D: Society and Space whilst serving as managing editor, from 1979 to 2012, of Environment and Planning A.

Thrift's early work was most readily associated with the study of time and time-geography and with economic geography, especially international finance. His later work has paid attention to a variety of topics including the nature of space, cities, information technology, repair and maintenance, and especially 'non-representational theory', a body of work that stresses the performative aspects of practice in Western societies. His work on time, language, power, representations, and the body has been particularly influential, and it has been suggested that Thrift's career reflects and in some cases spurred substantial intellectual changes in human geography in the 1980s and 1990s.

Non-representational theory is concerned with performative and embodied knowledges and is a radical attempt to wrench the social sciences and humanities out of an over-emphasis on representation and interpretation by moving away from contemplative models of thought and action to those based on practice. Thrift has claimed that non-representational theory addresses the "unprocessual" nature of much of social and cultural theory. Major themes within non-representational theory include subjectification, space as a verb, technologies of being, embodiment, and play and excess. Non-representational theory has provoked substantial debate within the field of human geography around the limits of the mediation of our world through language and how we might see, sense, and communicate beyond it.

Thrift has also edited and authored a number of books, encyclopaedias, and primers in human geography.

University Leadership 
At Bristol, Thrift was Chair of the Research Assessment Panel and then the Research Committee.

At Oxford, Thrift served as head of the Life and Environmental Sciences Division before becoming Pro-Vice-Chancellor for Research.

Thrift's role as Vice Chancellor at Warwick saw him launch several new initiatives, boosting the  University's presence in London (an expansion of the Business School in The Shard building) and overseas (through a strong partnership with Monash University, and with plans to develop a campus in California). Warwick is now ranked firmly in the world's top 100 universities, and in the top 10 in the UK.

Thrift was a chair of a section of the British Research Assessment Exercise (Main Panel H, 2005–07 and member, 2001 Panel for Geography), chaired the Industry Commission on Higher Education (2012-) and the IPPR Commission on the Future of Higher Education.

Controversies
In the financial year 2011–12, Thrift's salary rose by £50,000 (21%) to £288,000. Some students claimed that the pay raise was unjustified, but their protests were rebuffed. In June 2013 when a pay rise of £42,000 (to £316,000) was announced, a small number of students again protested. The grounds were that the raise went against university cutbacks to staff and student support/bursaries.

Thrift's pay increase of £16,000 announced in December 2014, was again met with protests. On 3 December 2014 police used CS spray to tackle protests at the University of Warwick, after a security guard was assaulted (two protestors, including a student were later prosecuted). The University issued a written statement that expressed concern at the situation and denounced the alleged violence.

Recognition and awards
Knighted, for services to higher education (2015) 
Deputy Lieutenant for the West Midlands (2014)
Honorary LLD, Monash University (2013)
Honorary LLD, University of Bristol (2010)
Scottish Geographical Medal, Royal Scottish Geographical Society (2008)
Distinguished Scholarship Honours, Association of American Geographers (2007)
Victoria Medal of the Royal Geographical Society. (2003) 
Fellow of the British Academy (2003)(2003)
Fellow, Academy of Learned Societies for the Social Sciences FAcSS (2000)
Fellow, Swedish Collegium for Advanced Study in the Social Sciences (1999)
University of Helsinki Medal (1999)
Newbigin Prize, Royal Scottish Geographical Society (1998) 
Fellow, Netherlands Institute of Advanced Study (1993)
Royal Geographical Society Heath Award (1988)

Selected bibliography

Selected books
Thrift has written several monographs and co-authored books.

Peet R & Thrift N (Eds.) (1989) New Models in Geography: The Political-Economy Perspective, Boston: Unwin-Hyman.
Pile S & Thrift N  (Eds.) (1995) Mapping the Subject: Geographies of Cultural Transformation, New York, NY: Routledge.
Thrift N (1996) Spatial Formations, Thousand Oaks, CA: Sage.
Corbridge S, Martin R & Thrift N(Eds.) (1997) Money, Power and Space, Oxford: Blackwell.
Leyshon A & Thrift N (Eds.) (1997) Money/Space: Geographies of Monetary Transformation, London: Routledge.
Miller D, Jackson P, Holbrook B, Thrift N and Rowlands, M (1998) Shopping, Place and Identity, London: Routledge.
Pile S and Thrift N (Eds.) (2000)City A-Z: Urban Fragments. London: Routledge.
Crang M and Thrift N (eds.) (2000) Thinking Space (Critical Geographies) London: Routledge.
Amin A Massey D and Thrift N (2000) Cities for All the People Not the Few. Bristol: Policy Press.
Thrift N and May J (eds.) (2001) Timespace: Geographies of Temporality. London: Routledge.
Amin A and Thrift N (2002) Cities: Reimagining the Urban. Cambridge: Polity Press.
Amin A Massey D and Thrift N (2003) Decentring the Nation. A Radical Approach to the Regions. London: Catalyst.
Harrison S Pile S and Thrift N (eds.) (2004) Patterned Ground: Entanglements of Nature and Culture. London: Reaktion.
Thrift N (2005) Knowing Capitalism (Theory, Culture and Society). London: Sage.
Thrift N (2007) Non-Representational Theory. London: Routledge.
Glennie P & Thrift N (2009) Shaping The Day: A History of Timekeeping in England and Wales 1300 – 1800. Oxford: Oxford University Press.
Kitchin R. & Thrift N. (2009). The International Encyclopedia of Human Geography, Oxford and Boston: Elsevier Publishing.
Amin A. and N. Thrift. (2013) Arts of the Political: New Openings For the Left. Durham, NC: Duke University Press.
Thrift N, A. Tickell, S. Woolgar, and W.H. Rupp (eds.). 2014. Globalisation in Practice. Oxford University Press. 
Thrift N, A. Amin (2016) Seeing Like a City. Cambridge: Polity Press
Thrift, N. (2021) Killer Cities. London: Sage
Thrift, N. (2022) The Pursuit of Possibility. Redesigning Research Universities. Bristol: Bristol University Press.

Journal articles
Thrift N (1981) "Owners time and own time: The making of capitalist time consciousness, 1300–1880" in Pred A (Ed.) Space and Time in Geography: Essays dedicated to Torston Hagerstrand, Lund: Lund Studies in Geography Series B, No. 48
Thrift N (1983) "On the determination of social action in space and time", Environment and Planning D: Society and Space 1: pp. 23–57
Thrift N (1997) "The Rise of Soft Capitalism" in  Cultural Values, Volume 1, Number 1, 1997, pp. 29–57
Thrift N (1999) "Steps to an Ecology of Place" in Massey D, Allen J & Sarre P (Eds.) Human Geography Today, Cambridge: Polity Press: pp. 295–323
Thrift N (2000a) "Performing cultures in the new economy", Annals of the Association of American Geographers 4: pp. 674–692
Thrift N (2000b) "Afterwords", Environment and Planning D: Society and Space 18 (3): pp. 213–255
Thrift N & Olds K (1996) "Refiguring the economic in economic geography", Progress in Human Geography 20: pp. 311–337
Thrift N (2004) "Intensities of Feeling: Towards a Spatial Politics of Affect" in  Geografiska Annaler: Series B, Human Geography, Volume 86, Number 1, pp. 57–78
Thrift N (2005) "But malice aforethought: cities and the natural history of hatred" in  Transactions of the Institute of British Geographers, Volume 30, Number 2, pp. 133–150

References

External links 
Warf B (2004) "Nigel Thrift" in Hubbard P, Kitchin R & Valentine G (Eds.) Key Thinkers on Space and Place, London: Sage

1949 births
Living people
British geographers
Alumni of Aberystwyth University
Academics of the University of Bristol
Pro-Vice-Chancellors of the University of Oxford
Academics of the University of Wales, Lampeter
Vice-Chancellors of the University of Warwick
Fellows of the Academy of Social Sciences
Fellows of the Royal Scottish Geographical Society
Deputy Lieutenants of the West Midlands (county)
Fellows of the British Academy
People from Nailsea
Knights Bachelor
Human geographers
Victoria Medal recipients